Bimal is an Indian or Nepalese given name, mostly masculine. Notable people of this name include:

Bimal Kumar Bachhawat (1925–1996), Indian neurochemist and glycobiologist
Bimal Bora, Assamese politician
Bimal Bose (Bimal Krishna Bose; 1918–1996), Indian cricketer
Bimal Kumar Bose (born 1932), Indian electrical engineer and academic in the field of artificial intelligence
Bimal Chandra (1925–before 2003), Indian Olympic swimmer
Bimal Gharti Magar (born 1998), Nepalese footballer
Bimal Ghosh (born 1956), Indian footballer
Bimal Guha (born 1952), Bangladeshi poet
Bimal Gurung (born 1964), Indian Gurkha politician and wanted criminal.
Bimal Jadeja (born 1962), Indian cricketer
Bimal Jalan (born 1941), Indian financial expert, Governor of Reserve Bank of India 2000–2004
Bimal Jayakody, Sri Lankan actor
Bimal Kaur Khalsa (Bibi Bimal Kaur; died 1990), Indian female politician; wife of Beant Singh, one of the assassins of Indira Gandhi
Bimal Lakra (born 1980), Indian hockey player
Bimal Magar (born 1989), Nepalese footballer
Bimal Krishna Matilal (1935–1991), Indian philosopher, Spalding Professor (University of Oxford) 1977–1991
Bimal Minj (born 1988), Indian footballer
Bimal Mitra (1912–1991), Bengali writer
Bimal Mitra (cricketer) (1914–nk), Bengali cricketer
Bimal Mukherjee (1903–1996), Indian traveller and bicyclist
Bimal Patel (born 1961), Indian architect, academic and town planner
Bimal N. Patel, Indian Professor of Law and Member of Law Commission
Bimal Prasad (1923–2015), Indian historian
Bimal Rathnayake, Sri Lankan politician
Bimal Roy (1909–1965), Indian film director
Bimal Roy Memorial Trophy
Bimal Kumar Roy, Indian statistician and cryptologist
Bimal Soni, Indian cricket manager
Bimal Tarafdar (born 1974), Bangladeshi sprinter

See also
 Bimaal
 Bīmāl Revolt
 Vimala Temple, dedicated to the goddess Bimala or Vimala